The Grubb Springs Community Building, formerly the Grubb Springs School, is a historic school building in Boone County, Arkansas.  The building is a single-story stone gable-roofed structure located northeast of the junction of Arkansas Highways 43 and 397, west of Harrison.  Construction began on the building in 1892 by the local Methodist congregation, intending its use as a church.  The land and unfinished building were sold in 1896 to the local school district, which completed the building.  It was used as a school until 1944, and has since been converted into a community center.

The building was listed on the National Register of Historic Places in 1996.  It was deemed significant as a surviving stone one-room schoolhouse example.

See also
National Register of Historic Places listings in Boone County, Arkansas

References

School buildings on the National Register of Historic Places in Arkansas
One-room schoolhouses in Arkansas
School buildings completed in 1892
National Register of Historic Places in Boone County, Arkansas
Schools in Boone County, Arkansas
1892 establishments in Arkansas